Hyatt v. Vincennes Nat. Bank, 113 U.S. 408 (1885), was a case involving the sale of property conveyed to Hyatt for a term of 50 years for all the mineral coal upon and under a described tract of land, in Knox County, Indiana, with the exclusive right to enter on the land to dig for the coal, and remove it, and to occupy with constructions and buildings as needed to obtain the coal.  Hyatt would then have the right to remove all buildings or fixtures placed on the land, when the agreement expired, and to pay a fixed royalty for the coal mined.

Background
Under a judgment against Hyatt, the Sheriff of Knox County executed a judgment to a creditor by selling at the Knox County courthouse door, as prescribed by statute for the sale of real estate, the interest of Hyatt in the term of years and certain buildings and articles belonging to him, which were a part of the structures and machinery for operating a coal mine on the land, and which were firmly attached to the land. In a suit in equity brought by the purchaser against another judgment creditor and the sheriff, to enjoin interference with the property so purchased, held that under the Revised Statutes of Indiana of 1852, 2 Rev.Stat., part 2, c. 1, Act of June 18, 1852, vol. 2 of Davis' edition of 1876, art. 24, sec. 520, p. 232, and art. 22, secs. 463, 466 and 407 (as amended February 2, 1855), pp. 215, 217, the sale of the property as real estate was valid.

Decision
Justice Blatchford delivered the opinion of the court, saying:

The statute in force at the time, in regard to the sale of personal property on execution, 2 Rev.Stat. Ind. 1852, pt. 2, c. 1; Act June 18, 1852, art. 22, §§ 468, 469, vol. 2 Davis' ed. 1876, p. 218, provided as follows:

"SEC. 468. Previous notice of the time and place of the sale of any personal property on execution shall be given for ten days successively, by posting up written notices thereof in at least three of the most public places in the township where the sale is to be made."
"SEC. 469. Personal property shall not be sold unless the same shall be present and subject to the view of those attending the sale, and it shall be sold at public auction in such lots and parcels as shall be calculated to bring the highest price."

The Revised Statutes of Indiana of 1852, in force at the time, in regard to the sale of real estate on execution, 2 Rev.Stat. pt. 2, c. 1; Act of June 18, 1852, vol. 2 Davis' ed. 1876, provided as follows, Art. 24, § 526, p. 232:

"SEC. 526. The following real estate shall be liable to all judgments and attachments, and to be sold on execution against the debtor owning the same, or for whose use the same is holden, viz., first, all lands of the judgment debtor, whether, in possession, reversion, or remainder; second, lands fraudulently conveyed with intent to delay or defraud creditors; third, all rights of redeeming mortgaged lands; also, all lands held by virtue of any land office certificate, fourth, lands and any estate or interest therein holden by anyone in trust for or to the use of another; fifth, all chattels real of the judgment debtor."

Art. 22, § 463, p. 215:
"SEC. 463. The estate or interest of the judgment debtor in any real estate shall not be sold on execution until the rents and profits thereof, for a term not exceeding seven years, shall have been first offered for sale at public auction, but, if the same shall not sell for a sum sufficient to satisfy the execution, then the estate or interest of the judgment debtor shall be sold by virtue of the execution."

Art. 22, § 466, p. 217:
"SEC. 466. Real estate, taken by virtue of any execution, shall be sold at public auction at the door of the courthouse of the county in which the same is situated, and if the estate shall consist of several lots, tracts, and parcels, each shall be offered separately, and no more of any real estate shall be offered for sale than shall be necessary to satisfy the execution, unless the same is not susceptible of division."

Art. 22, § 467, as amended February 2, 1855, p. 217:
"SEC. 467. The time and place of making sale of real estate, on execution, shall be publicly advertised by the sheriff, for at least twenty days successively, next before the day of sale, by posting up written or printed notices thereof, in three public places in the township in which the real estate is situated, and a like advertisement at the door of the courthouse of the county, and also by advertising the same, for three weeks successively, in a newspaper printed nearest to the real estate, if any such newspaper be printed within the jurisdiction of the sheriff."

In the rules prescribed by the act, Art. 48, § 797, p. 313, vol. 2 of Davis' ed. 1876, for its construction, it is enacted that such rules shall be observed "when consistent with the context." Among those rules are these—that "the word "land" and the phrases "real estate" and "real property" include lands, tenements, and hereditaments" and that "the phrase personal property' includes goods, chattels, evidences of debt, and things in action." But no definition or construction is given of the phrase "chattels real." 

The Revised Statutes of Indiana of 843, Act of February 11, 1843, pt. 2, c. 29, Art. 1, § 1, provided as follows:

"Section 1. When, by any law of this state, real estate is authorized or directed to be sold by virtue of any execution, the same shall be construed to mean and include, 1. all the lands, tenements, and hereditaments of the judgment debtor, whether, in possession, reversion, or remainder; 2. lands, tenements, and hereditaments fraudulently conveyed with intent to defeat, delay, or defraud creditors; 3. all rights of redeeming mortgaged lands, tenements, or hereditaments, and also all lands held by virtue of any land office certificate; 4. lands, tenements, and hereditaments, and any estate or interest therein, holden by anyone in trust for or to the use of another, on execution issued on any judgment against the person to whose use, or for whose benefit, the same are holden."

The provisions of these four clauses were substantially retained in the Revision of 1852, and the provision as to "chattels real of the judgment debtor" was added as a 5th clause. Although, by the Revised Statutes of 1843, part 2, chap. 29; Art. 1, § 3, p. 454, judgments were made a lien on real estate and chattels real of the judgment debtor, which provision is contained in the Revision of 1852, part 2, c. 1, Art. 24, § 527, vol. 2 of Davis' edition of 1876, chattels real were not specifically made liable to sale on execution as real estate until 1852, when the 5th clause was added.

That clause must be interpreted according to the accepted meaning of the words "chattels real." Blackstone defines chattels real, according to Sir Edward Coke, 1 Inst. 118, to be such as concern or savor of the realty, as terms for years of land, and says they are called real chattels as being interests issuing out of or annexed to real estates, of which they have one quality, viz., immobility, which denominates them real, but want the other, viz., a sufficient legal indeterminate duration, which want it is that constitutes them chattels. 2 Bl.Com. 386. Chancellor Kent says, 2 Kent 342:
"Chattels real are interests annexed to or concerning the realty, as a lease for years of land, and the duration of the term of the lease is immaterial, provided it be fixed and determinate, and there be a reversion or remainder in fee in some other person. "

The motion made in the circuit court to modify the decree was based on the idea, that while the term for years might be a chattel real, the machinery, buildings, fixtures, and improvements placed on the land should have been sold as personal property. As the statute requires that real estate "shall" be sold at the door of the courthouse, the visible property could not be sold there in view of the persons attending the sale of the real estate, unless it was first severed from the land, and to have so treated it would, doubtless, have rendered not only it but the term for years worthless, as vendible articles. No such result could have been contemplated by the lawmakers, and none such can be allowed, if another reasonable and consistent construction is to be found.

It is not necessary or proper to consider any question involved in any right of redemption. Nor is it intended to decide anything as to the status of any of the property, aside from the lawfulness of the manner of its sale, under the statute in regard to such sale.

The decree of the circuit court was affirmed.

See also
List of United States Supreme Court cases, volume 113

References

External links
 

United States Supreme Court cases
United States Supreme Court cases of the Waite Court
Federal court cases involving Indiana
1885 in United States case law
Knox County, Indiana
Coal mining in the United States
Coal mining law